Mai (เทศบาลตำบลใหม่) is a subdistrict municipality in Non Sung District, Nakhon Ratchasima Province. It was created as a Tambon Administrative Organization (TAO) was in 1996, and upgraded to a municipality in 2008.

External links
http://www.mai.go.th/ Website of Mai municipality (Thai)

References

Populated places in Nakhon Ratchasima province